The 1978 Tour of the Basque Country was the 18th edition of the Tour of the Basque Country cycle race and was held from 3 April to 7 April 1978. The race started in Leitza and finished at the Alto de Uncella. The race was won by José Antonio González Linares of the Kas team.

General classification

References

1978
Bas